The biennial Charlotte mayoral election was held on November 3, 2009. The seat was open due to the decision by Mayor Pat McCrory, a Republican, not to seek re-election. Democrat Anthony Foxx, a member of the City Council, won the election by a slim margin, becoming the first Democrat elected to lead the city since Harvey Gantt was re-elected in 1985.

Candidates

Democrats

Announced
Anthony Foxx,  City Council member

Not Running
Malcolm Graham, member of the North Carolina Senate
Craig Madans, 2003/2005 Democratic nominee for mayor

Republicans

Announced
John Lassiter, City Council member
Martin Davis 
Jack Stratton

Primary election results

General election results

Polling

Foxx (D) v. Lassiter (R)

Footnotes

External links 
Charlotte Observer: 'It's time to move on' , Dec. 12, 2008.

2009
Charlotte mayoral
Charlotte